The City of Lismore is a local government area in the Northern Rivers region of New South Wales, Australia. The seat of the local government area is Lismore, a major regional centre of the state.

The mayor of Lismore City Council since December 2021 is Steve Krieg.

Towns and localities

 Lismore suburban
 Chilcotts Grass
 East Lismore
 Girards Hill
 Goonellabah
 Howards Grass
 Lismore
 Lismore Heights
 Loftville
 North Lismore
 Richmond Hill
 South Lismore

 Other areas

 Bentley
 Bexhill
 Blakebrook
 Blue Knob
 Booerie Creek
 Buckendoon
 Bungabbee State Forest
 Caniaba
 Clunes
 Coffee Camp
 Corndale
 Dorroughby
 Dungarubba
 Dunoon
 East Coraki
 Eltham
 Fernside
 Georgica
 Goolmangar
 Gundurimba
 Jiggi
 Keerrong
 Koonorigan
 Larnook
 Leycester
 Lillian Rock
 Lindendale
 McKees Hill
 Modanville
 Monaltrie
 Nimbin
 North Woodburn
 Numulgi
 Pearces Creek
 Rock Valley
 Rosebank
 Rous Mill
 Ruthven
 South Gundurimba
 Terania Creek
 The Channon
 Tregeagle
 Tucki Tucki
 Tuckurimba
 Tullera
 Tuncester
 Tuntable Creek
 Whian Whian
 Woodlawn
 Wyrallah
 Yeagerton

Heritage listings
The City of Lismore has a number of heritage-listed sites, including:
 High Conservation Value Old Growth forest

Demographics 
At the 2016 census, there were  people in the Lismore local government area, of these 48.6 per cent were male and 51.4 per cent were female. Aboriginal and Torres Strait Islander people made up 5 per cent of the population, which was significantly higher than the national average of 2.8 per cent. The median age of people in the City of Lismore area was 43 years, higher than the national median of 38 years. 82 percent of people in the city were born in Australia, some 15 percent higher than the nation as a whole.

When compared with total population growth of Australia for the same periods, being 5.78 per cent and 8.32 per cent respectively, population growth in the Lismore local government area was significantly lower than the national average. The median weekly income for residents within the City of Lismore area was marginally lower than the national average.

At the 2011 census, the proportion of residents in the Lismore local government area who stated their ancestry as Australian or Anglo-Celtic exceeded 83 per cent of all residents (national average was 65.2 per cent). In excess of 24 per cent of all residents in the City of Lismore at the 2011 census nominated no religious affiliation, compared to the national average of 22.3 per cent. Meanwhile, affiliation with Christianity was 55 per cent, which was slightly higher than the national average of 50.2 per cent. As at the census date, compared to the national average, households in the Lismore local government area had a significantly lower than average proportion (3.5 per cent) where two or more languages are spoken (national average was 20.4 per cent); and a significantly higher proportion (92.9 per cent) where English only was spoken at home (national average was 76.8 per cent).

Council

Current composition and election method
Lismore City Council is composed of eleven councillors, including the mayor, for a fixed four-year term of office. The mayor is directly elected while the ten other councillors are elected proportionally as one entire ward. The most recent election was held in 2021, and the makeup of the council, including the mayor, is as follows:

Executive management
Lismore City Council is managed by a general manager and three senior managers. General Manager Shelley Oldham's employment was terminated on 9 February 2021. The current acting general manager is Michael Donnelly. A decision is expected on a permanent appointment to general manager in mid-2021.

The three senior management roles are currently occupied by Kate Webbe – director of corporate services, Peter Jeuken – director of infrastructure services, and Eber Butron – director of partnerships, planning & engagement.

Sister cities

Lismore has sister city relations with the following cities:

 Isle of Lismore, Scotland
 Yamatotakada, Japan, since 1963
 Lismore, Ireland, since 2000
 Eau Claire, Wisconsin, USA, since 2001
 Makassar, Indonesia

References

External links 
 

 
Lismore
Northern Rivers
Lismore